The 2010 Hyundai Sun Bowl game was the 77th edition of the annual college football bowl game known as the Sun Bowl. It was played on December 31, 2010 between the Miami Hurricanes from the ACC and the independent Notre Dame Fighting Irish, in a revival of a long-dormant rivalry. CBS television broadcast the 2 p.m. (ET) game. Hyundai took over as the title sponsor. Bernie Olivas is its executive director.

Team selection

Notre Dame Fighting Irish

The Irish improved from a 4-5 start to receive their first ever Sun Bowl appearance. An impressive November showing boasted victories over #15 Utah and against rival USC in Los Angeles.

Miami Hurricanes

What looked to be a second strong season in a row was derailed by late season losses to Virginia and South Florida. The losses would cost head coach Randy Shannon his job. Offensive line coach Jeff Stoutland had taken over coaching duties for the Sun Bowl. Miami’s strength has been its defense, as the Canes rank No. 2 nationally in pass defense, No. 6 in sacks and No. 1 in tackles for loss.  They were making their first-ever appearance in the Sun Bowl.

Game notes

The Sun Bowl marked the 24th meeting between the two schools. Notre Dame held a 15–7–1 advantage in the prior matchups. The last meeting between the two was a 29–20 Notre Dame victory in 1990. This was the first ever postseason bowl meeting between the Irish and the Hurricanes.  The game sold out in 21 hours, the fastest in the Sun Bowl's 77-year history, and the crowd of 54,021 set a bowl attendance record, despite the temperature being below freezing.

Tommy Rees passed for 201 yards and two touchdowns to Michael Floyd as Notre Dame beat Miami 33–17  The Irish reached the end zone on three of its first four possessions. Rees tossed TD passes of 3 and 34 yards to Floyd and Cierre Wood broke free on a 34-yard scoring run. David Ruffer added field goals from 40, 50 and 19 yards. The Irish defense picked off Miami starting quarterback Jacory Harris 3 times and logged 4 total interceptions in the first half to help the team jump out to a 27–0 lead in the first half. The Hurricanes tried to rally in the 4th quarter behind backup quarterback Stephen Morris, who threw a 6-yard touchdown to Leonard Hankerson and a 42-yard scoring play to Tommy Streeter, but it was too late by then. Rees was able to make some key first downs to effectively run out the clock late in the 4th quarter.

Game summary

Scoring summary

References

Sun Bowl
Sun Bowl
Miami Hurricanes football bowl games
Notre Dame Fighting Irish football bowl games
December 2010 sports events in the United States
2010 in sports in Texas